The 2016 Women's National Invitation Tournament is a single-elimination tournament of 64 NCAA Division I teams that were not selected to participate in the 2016 Women's NCAA tournament. The annual tournament began on March 16 and ended on April 2, with the championship game televised on CBS Sports Network. All games will be played on the campus sites of participating schools.

Participants
The 2016 Postseason WNIT field will consist of 32 automatic invitations – one from each conference – and 32 (or more) at-large teams. The intention of the WNIT Selection Committee is to select the best available at-large teams in the nation. A team offered an automatic berth by the WNIT shall be the team that is the highest-finishing team in its conference's regular-season standings, and not selected for the NCAA Tournament. A team that fulfills these qualities, and accepts, will earn the WNIT automatic berth for its conference, regardless of overall record. The remaining berths in the WNIT are filled by the best teams available. Any team considered for an at-large berth must have an overall record of .500 or better.  Should a conference's automatic qualifier team decline the WNIT bid, the conference forfeits its AQ spot and that berth goes into the at-large pool. NC State and Arkansas qualified as invitees from the ACC and SEC respectively but each declined to participate.

Automatic qualifiers

At-large bids

Bracket
All times are listed as Eastern Daylight Time (UTC-4).
* – Denotes overtime period.

Semifinals and championship game

All-tournament team
 Nicole Seekamp, South Dakota (MVP)
 Maite Cazorla, Oregon
 Madison Ristovski, Michigan
 Whitney Knight, Florida Gulf Coast
 Kaneisha Atwater, Florida Gulf Coast
 Tia Hemiller, South Dakota
Source:

See also
 2016 NCAA Division I women's basketball tournament
 2016 Women's Basketball Invitational
 2016 National Invitation Tournament

References

Women's National Invitation Tournament
Women's National Invitation Tournament
Women's National Invitation Tournament
Women's National Invitation Tournament
Women's National Invitation Tournament